Corowa, an electoral district of the Legislative Assembly in the Australian state of New South Wales had two incarnations, from 1904 until 1920 and from 1927 until 1950.


Election results

Elections in the 1940s

1947

1946 by-election

1944

1941

Elections in the 1930s

1938

1937 by-election

1935

1932

1930

Elections in the 1920s

1927

1920 - 1927

Elections in the 1910s

1917

1913

1910

Elections in the 1900s

1907

1904

Notes

References

New South Wales state electoral results by district